Karl Alfred Hansen (30 July 1890 – 5 April 1959) was a Swedish Army officer horse rider who competed in the 1928 Summer Olympics. He and his horse Gerold finished sixth in the individual jumping and won a bronze medal with the Swedish jumping team.

Hansen was major in the Swedish Army.

References

1890 births
1959 deaths
Swedish Army officers
Swedish male equestrians
Swedish show jumping riders
Olympic equestrians of Sweden
Equestrians at the 1928 Summer Olympics
Olympic bronze medalists for Sweden
Olympic medalists in equestrian
Medalists at the 1928 Summer Olympics
Sportspeople from Linköping
Sportspeople from Östergötland County